Qebui is the Egyptian god of the North Wind. In art, Qebui appears as a man with four ram heads, or a winged, four-headed ram. He is also associated with the lands beyond the third cataract of the Nile.

References

External links

Egyptian gods
Wind gods